Prior to 1963, the Medal of Honor could be awarded for actions not involving direct combat with "an enemy of the United States" or "opposing foreign force [s]" (actions against a party in which the U.S. is not directly engaged in war with). 204 men earned the medal in this way. The vast majority of the non-combat medals were awarded to members of the United States Navy for their actions during boiler explosions, man-overboard incidents, and other hazards of naval service. The list includes 10 Navy officers and men who earned the Medal of Honor for non-combat actions during the First World War and one who received it during World War II. 

The last award of the Medal of Honor for valor not in combat was Francis P. Hammerberg, a United States Navy diver who received the Medal of Honor posthumously for rescuing two fellow divers at Pearl Harbor in the then Territory of Hawaii. He lost his life during rescue operations on February 17, 1945.

Given in the list below are the place and date of each recipient's Medal of Honor action, as well as their rank at the time of the action. A posthumous award is denoted by an asterisk after the recipient's name.

Medal of Honor

The Medal of Honor was created during the American Civil War and is the highest military decoration presented by the United States to a member of its armed forces. Currently, the recipient must have distinguished themselves at the risk of their own life above and beyond the call of duty in action against "an enemy of the United States" or "an opposing foreign force." Due to the nature of this medal, it is commonly presented posthumously.
A Medal of Honor in non-combat has not been presented since 1945.

List of recipients

Note: Notes in quotations are derived or are copied from the official Medal of Honor citation

Notes

References

 
 
 
 
 
 

Peacetime